A Lady Did It is a 1938 Italian "white-telephones" comedy film directed by Mario Mattoli and starring Michele Abruzzo, Rosina Anselmi and Alida Valli. It was shot at Cinecittà Studios in Rome. The film's sets were designed by the art director Alfredo Montori.

Main cast
 Michele Abruzzo as Luca Sardo
 Rosina Anselmi as Rosa Sardo
 Alida Valli as Maria Sardo
 Nino Taranto as Nino
 Virgilio Riento as Pasquale
 Tina Pica as Teresa, la portinaia
 Nando Bruno as Un collego di Pasquale

References

Bibliography
 Aprà, Adriano. The Fabulous Thirties: Italian cinema 1929-1944. Electa International, 1979.

External links

1938 films
1930s Italian-language films
Italian black-and-white films
Films directed by Mario Mattoli
Films shot at Cinecittà Studios
1938 comedy films
Italian comedy films
1930s Italian films